

Bs

BSS Plus
BSS. Redirects to Bismuth subsalicylate.

Bu

Buc-Bud 

bucainide (INN)
bucelipase alfa (USAN)
Bucet (Forest Laboratories)
bucetin (INN)
buciclovir (INN)
bucillamine (INN)
bucindolol (INN)
bucladesine (INN)
Bucladin-S
buclizine (INN)
buclosamide (INN)
bucloxic acid (INN)
bucolome (INN)
bucricaine (INN)
bucrilate (INN)
bucromarone (INN)
bucumolol (INN)
budesonide (INN)
budiodarone (USAN, INN)
budipine (INN)
budotitane (INN)
budralazine (INN)

Buf-Bun 

Buf-Puf Acne Cleansing Bar (3M)
bufenadrine (INN)
bufeniode (INN)
bufetolol (INN)
bufexamac (INN)
bufezolac (INN)
Bufferin
buflomedil (INN)
bufogenin (INN)
buformin (INN)
bufrolin (INN)
bufuralol (INN)
bumadizone (INN)
bumecaine (INN)
bumepidil (INN)
bumetanide (INN)
bumetrizole (INN)
Bumex (Roche)
Buminate (Baxter International)
bunaftine (INN)
bunamidine (INN)
bunamiodyl (INN)
bunaprolast (INN)
bunazosin (INN)
bunitrolol (INN)
bunolol (INN)

Bup-Bus 

Bupap (ECR Pharmaceuticals)
buparvaquone (INN)
buphenine (INN)
Buphenyl (Ucyclyd Pharma)
bupicomide (INN)
bupivacaine (INN)
bupranolol (INN)
Buprenex
buprenorphine (INN)
bupropion (INN)
buquineran (INN)
buquinolate (INN)
buquiterine (INN)
buramate (INN)
burapitant (INN)
Burinex
burixafor (INN)
Burn-O-Jel
burodiline (INN)
buserelin (INN)
Buspar (Bristol-Myers Squibb)
Buspirex
buspirone (INN)
busulfan (INN)
Busulfex (Orphan Medical)

But

Buta 

Butabarb
butacaine (INN)
Butace
butaclamol (INN)
butadiazamide (INN)
butafosfan (INN)
Butal compound
butalamine (INN)
Butalan
butalbital (INN)
butamirate (INN)
butamisole (INN)
butamoxane (INN)
butanilicaine (INN)
butanixin (INN)
butanserin (INN)
butantrone (INN)
Butapap (Mikart)
butaperazine (INN)
butaprost (INN)
butaverine (INN)
butaxamine (INN)
Butazolidin

Bute-Buti 

butedronic acid (INN)
butenafine (INN)
buterizine (INN)
butetamate (INN)
Butex Forte
buthalital sodium (INN)
butibufen (INN)
Buticaps
butidrine (INN)
butikacin (INN)
butilfenin (INN)
butinazocine (INN)
butinoline (INN)
butirosin (INN)
Butisol Sodium
butixirate (INN)
butixocort (INN)
butizide (INN)

Buto-Buty 

butobendine (INN)
butoconazole (INN)
butocrolol (INN)
butoctamide captamine (INN)
butofilolol (INN)
butonate (INN)
butopamine (INN)
butopiprine (INN)
butoprozine (INN)
butopyrammonium iodide (INN)
butorphanol (INN)
butoxylate (INN)
butriptyline (INN)
butropium bromide (INN)
butynamine (INN)

Buz 

Buzepide metiodide (INN)

Bw-By 

BW524W91
Byclomine
Bydramine
Bydureon (Amylin Pharmaceuticals)
Byetta (Amylin Pharmaceuticals)